Sree Rama Varma High School, officially Sree Rama Varma Govt Model Higher Secondary School and popularly known as SRV High School) is the largest government-owned school in Kochi, Kerala, India. It was founded by the Kochi Royal family as the English Elementary School in 1845. The school was later named after King Rama Varma of the founding Kochi Royal family. After the independence of India from British rule in 1947, and the reorganization of the states of India in 1956, the school was handed over to the Government of Kerala, which now owns and operates it.

History 
In 1845, the school was founded as the English Elementary School, located in what is now the campus of Maharaja's College, Ernakulam. It was renamed as Raja's School in 1865, and was upgraded to a college in 1875. Later, the school was separated from the college, was moved to its present location, and was renamed Sree Rama Varma High School.

Organization 
Sree Rama Varma High School offers curricula for grades 1 to 12. The school is divided into four sections: Lower Primary (grades 1 to 4), Upper Primary (grades 5 to 7), High School (grades 8 to 10), and Higher Secondary (grades 11 and 12). The different sections have separate, though adjoining, campuses as well as separate administration.

Architecture
The architecture of the school showcases the British architectural styling of colonial Kerala. It is a two-story building built using primarily lime and teak wood. The floor and roof utilize terracotta tiles.

ISRO Space Museum 
Donated by the Indian Space Research Organization (ISRO) during the term of the former chairman Krishnaswamy Kasturirangan (a former student of the school), the school contains a Space Museum, which showcases the ISRO's space research and educates students in space science. The museum displays miniature replicas of ISRO's satellites as well as satellite launch vehicles. The exhibits educate students on various kinds of satellites and launch techniques, namely the ISRO's Polar Satellite Launch Vehicle, geosynchronous satellites, and related technologies and applications such as remote sensing. It was inaugurated by former President of India Dr. A. P. J. Abdul Kalam on 19 December 2006.

Notable alumni 
 Krishnaswami Kasturirangan, space scientist, member of the Planning Commission, former chairman of the Indian Space Research Organization
 Changampuzha Krishna Pillai, Malayalam poet, known for his pastoral elegy Ramanan
 Swami Chinmayananda, founder of Chinmaya Mission
 N. S. Madhavan, writer
 G. N. Ramachandran, scientist, physicist, and Nobel Prize nominee
 K. V. Thomas, former member of Parliament
 V. R. Krishna Iyer, former supreme court justice, critic, independent supporter of leftist movements
 Aashiq Abu, film director and producer best known for his work in Malayalam cinema
 Amal Neerad, filmmaker
 C. V. Subramanian, mycologist, Shanti Swarup Bhatnagar Prize recipient
 Justice Shaji P. Chaly, judge of Kerala High Court
 V. Viswanatha Menon, Minister of Finance in Kerala

See also
List of schools in Ernakulam

References

High schools and secondary schools in Kochi
Educational institutions established in 1845
1845 establishments in British India